Goyescas, Op. 11, subtitled Los majos enamorados (The Gallants in Love), is a piano suite written in 1911 by Spanish composer Enrique Granados. It was inspired by the work of the Spanish artist Francisco Goya. The piano pieces have not been authoritatively associated with any particular paintings with two exceptions:
El amor y la muerte (Love and death) shares its title with one of Goya's prints from the series called Los caprichos
El pelele (The straw man) is one of Goya's tapestry cartoons

This piano suite is usually considered Granados's crowning creation. It forms part of the standard Romantic piano repertoire and is sometimes recorded by pianists who are not particularly associated with Spanish music.

Writing of the Goyescas

The piano writing of Goyescas is highly ornamented and extremely difficult to master, requiring both subtle dexterity and great power. Some of them have a strong improvisational feel, the clearest example of this being the fifth piece, called El amor y la muerte (Love and Death). The fourth piece in the series (Quejas, ó la maja y el ruiseñor—The Maiden and the Nightingale) is the best known piece from the suite. It resembles a nocturne, but is filled with intricate figuration, inner voices and, near the end, glittering bird-like trills and quicksilver arpeggios. Mexican songwriter Consuelo Velázquez based her 1940 song Bésame Mucho on this melody.

This piano suite was written in two books.  Work on Goyescas began in 1909, and by 31 August 1910, the composer was able to write that he had composed "great flights of imagination and difficulty."  Granados himself gave the première of Book I at the Palau de la Música Catalana in Barcelona on 11 March 1911.  He completed Book II in December 1911 and gave its first performance at the Salle Pleyel in Paris on 2 April 1914.

El pelele (The Straw Man), subtitled Escena goyesca, is usually programmed as part of the Goyescas suite; Granados gave the première in the Teatre Principal at Terrassa, on 29 March 1914.

The suite

Los requiebros (The Compliments)
Coloquio en la reja (Conversation at the Window)
El fandango de candil (Fandango by Candlelight)
Quejas, o La Maja y el ruiseñor (Complaint, or the Girl and the Nightingale)
El Amor y la muerte (Balada) (Ballad of Love and Death)
Epilogo: Serenata del espectro (Epilogue: Serenade to a Spectre)
El pelele: Escena Goyesca (The Puppet: Goya Scene)

Publication
Book One (the first four numbers of the suite) was published in Barcelona in 1912.

Recordings

20th century
Granados: the composer's playing of the work was captured on piano roll.
Goyescas, Part 1, Los Requiebros as recorded by Granados on piano roll, c. 1913, Paris
Alicia de Larrocha
Alicia de Larrocha was noted for her performances of Goyescas of which she made several recordings; a version on the RCA label was a winner at the 34th Annual Grammy Awards (Best classical instrumental solo recording 1991).
Douglas Riva
Thomas Rajna

21st century
Garrick Ohlsson
Kun-Woo Paik

Opera

In 1915 Granados wrote a one-act opera, also called Goyescas, to a Spanish libretto by Fernando Periquet y Zuaznaba, using melodies from the piano suite. This was first performed in 1916.

A film called Goyescas was based on the opera.

References

Kennedy, Michael (2006), The Oxford Dictionary of Music, 985 pages,

External links
 

Compositions by Enrique Granados
Spanish compositions for solo piano
Suites (music)
Music based on art
1911 compositions
1910s in Spanish music
Francisco Goya